Martynovsky (masculine), Martynovskaya (feminine), or Martynovskoye (neuter) is the name of several rural localities in Russia:
Martynovsky, Oryol Oblast, a settlement in Gostomlsky Selsoviet of Kromskoy District of Oryol Oblast
Martynovsky, Volgograd Oblast, a khutor in Deminsky Selsoviet of Novoanninsky District of Volgograd Oblast
Martynovskoye, Moscow Oblast, a selo in Aksinyinskoye Rural Settlement of Stupinsky District of Moscow Oblast
Martynovskoye, Vologda Oblast, a village in Kharovsky Selsoviet of Kharovsky District of Vologda Oblast
Martynovskaya, Arkhangelsk Oblast, a village in Voyezersky Selsoviet of Nyandomsky District of Arkhangelsk Oblast
Martynovskaya, Moscow Oblast, a village in Savvinskoye Rural Settlement of Yegoryevsky District of Moscow Oblast
Martynovskaya, Nyuksensky District, Vologda Oblast, a village in Uftyugsky Selsoviet of Nyuksensky District of Vologda Oblast
Martynovskaya, Totemsky District, Vologda Oblast, a village in Zaozersky Selsoviet of Totemsky District of Vologda Oblast
Martynovskaya, Verkhovazhsky District, Vologda Oblast, a village in Klimushinsky Selsoviet of Verkhovazhsky District of Vologda Oblast